Michel Beissière (born 14 January 1948) is a French rower. He competed in the men's coxless four event at the 1968 Summer Olympics.

References

1948 births
Living people
French male rowers
Olympic rowers of France
Rowers at the 1968 Summer Olympics
Place of birth missing (living people)